The R8A was a class of New York City Subway revenue cars built in 1939 by the St. Louis Car Company, and used to gather and transport tokens from stations along the IND division. 66 and 67 were the only two cars built. In their final years, they were renumbered twice, first as 20176 and 20177, and again as 30176 and 30177.

Being blind motors, the cars were usually towed around by a set of out of service R1-9 cars. 66 was last operated in 1970, after which it was removed from service, and sent to Jamaica Yard Training Services, to be used as a shed. It was removed some time before 1990 and scrapped. Car 67 was used as a school car, until it was scrapped in April 1986.

References

External links
nycsubway.org - NYC Subway Cars: R8A

Train-related introductions in 1939
R008A
Independent Subway System
St. Louis multiple units
1939 in rail transport
Scrapped locomotives